Unc-51-like kinase 2 (C. elegans) also known as ULK2 is an enzyme which in humans is encoded by the ULK2 gene. The gene is located within the Smith–Magenis syndrome region on chromosome 17.

Structure and function 

This gene encodes a protein that is similar to a serine/threonine kinase in C. elegans which is involved in axonal elongation. The structure of this protein is similar to the C. elegans protein in that both proteins have an N-terminal kinase domain, a central proline/serine rich (PS) domain, and a C-terminal (C) domain. ULK2 and the GTPase activating protein SynGAP function cooperatively in axon formation.

References

External links